The Pomorska Kolej Metropolitalna (PKM, 'Pomeranian Metropolitan Railway'), is a railway in the Tricity area connecting Gdańsk Lech Wałęsa Airport with Wrzeszcz. The line was officially opened by the Prime minister of Poland Ewa Kopacz on 30 August 2015 and regular train services started on 1 September 2015. The line is owned by the Pomeranian Voivodeship and managed by the Pomorska Kolej Metropolitalna, a company wholly owned by the voivodeship. Services on the line are provided by SKM and Polregio.

The railway line was constructed on the right-of-way of a pre-war line from Stara Piła to Wrzeszcz. At its northern end, the line connects with the existing, not electrified line to Gdynia, via Gdańsk Osowa and Wielki Kack. An advantage of re-opening this connection is that no buildings have had to be torn down, as the right-of-way of the old line is undisturbed and has not been encroached on anywhere.

The PKM line is 19.5 km long and connects at both ends with the SKM line which is the principal transportation corridor in the Gdańsk-Sopot-Gdynia Tricity area. Whereas the SKM line runs close to the shore of the Baltic Sea, the PKM lies further inland.

The Pomeranian Voivodeship describes the PKM as 'the greatest project (epokowa inwestycja) in the 12-year history of the Pomeranian Voivodeship,' pointing out that never before in its history has the Pomeranian government undertaken a project costing over 700 million zł (over $200 million).

The PKM has 11 stations and stops along the route, the twelfth is being built and due to open in 2023. The company also owns and operates further two stops, Gdynia Karwiny and Gdynia Stadion, located on the section of line 201 connecting Gdańsk Osowa and Gdynia Główna. The line is not electrified yet. It is worked by ten DMUs that were ordered from Pesa SA of Bydgoszcz costing 114 million zł ($34 million).

The PKM uses the European Train Control System Level 2 signalling system.

History
The contract for construction of the PKM was signed on 7 May 2013. Construction was scheduled to be completed by 30 June 2015.

In December 2020 the company awarded a contract to design and build a 1.5 km railway link between Gdańsk Kiełpinek and Gdańsk Kokoszki. The line will follow the alignment of the old railway line 234 that has been partly lifted in the past. The line is due to be reopened by December 2022.

Electrification works on the line started in June 2021 and are scheduled to be completed in 2023; new stop, Gdańsk Firoga, will also be built as part of the same contract.

Future plans
The company is considering extending its services towards the south, it may involve taking over and renewing existing disused railway line or building new one(s).

Rolling stock

External links
 PKM Website (in Polish)

References

Gdynia
Pomeranian Voivodeship
Railway companies of Poland
Railway lines in Poland
Transport in Gdańsk